Route 397 is a two-lane north/south highway located in the Abitibi-Témiscamingue region in Quebec, Canada. It starts at the junction of Route 117 in Val-d'Or and ends at the junction of Route 113 in Lac-Despinassy. It is also concurrent with Route 386 in Barraute.

Municipalities along Route 397

 Val-d'Or
 Barraute
 La Morandière-Rochebaucourt
 Lac-Despinassy

See also
 List of Quebec provincial highways

References

External links  
 Provincial Route Map (Courtesy of the Quebec Ministry of Transportation) 
 Route 397 on Google Maps

397
Roads in Abitibi-Témiscamingue
Val-d'Or